Meech is a surname. Notable people with the surname include:

 Athol Meech (1907–1981), Canadian rower
 Daniel Meech (born 1973), New Zealand equestrian
 Derek Meech (born 1984), Canadian ice hockey defenceman and winger
 Ezra Meech (1773–1856), American fur trader and politician
 James Meech (1884–1955), Australian cricketer
 Jeanette DuBois Meech (1835–1911), American evangelist and industrial educator
 Karen Jean Meech (born 1959), American astronomer
 Matilda Meech ( 1825 – 1907), New Zealand shopkeeper and businesswoman
 Molly Meech (born 1993), New Zealand sailor
 Sam Meech (born 1991), New Zealand sailor
 Thomas Meech (1868–1940), English journalist, author and lawyer